The mistletoe tyrannulet (Zimmerius parvus) is a very small bird, a passerine in family Tyrannidae, the tyrant flycatchers.

Taxonomy
The mistletoe tyrannulet was described in 1862 by the American amateur ornithologist George Newbold Lawrence under the binomial name Tyranniscus parvus. It was formerly considered to be conspecific with the Guatemalan tyrannulet (Zimmerius vilissimus), but the species were split based on a molecular phylogenetic study published in 2013.

Description
The mistletoe tyrannulet is a small bird, 11 - 12 cm in length as an adult.  Adults have a slaty cap, a bright white supercilium ("eyebrow"), an olive-green back and conspicuous yellow edging along the wing.

Distribution & habitat

Appearance
The mistletoe tyrannulet ranges from Guatemala and Honduras south to the extremity of northwestern Colombia.  It can be found in humid evergreen forest and edge, cultivation and semi-open areas with large trees.  It is a fairly common to common bird across its range.

Vocalizations
This species is a very frequent caller, incessantly giving a call that has been rendered variously as peeyaik, pee-peeu or pee-yuip and sounds similar to that of the thick-billed euphonia (Euphonia laniirostris), another mistletoe-loving species.

Behaviour

Nesting
The mistletoe tyrannulet's nest is a globular mass of rootlets, mosses and other plant matter, hidden in a tangle or growth or in an epiphyte.  The clutch is two whitish eggs, speckled rusty.

Feeding
The mistletoe tyrannulet is an active forager, moving quickly about with its tail cocked as it searches for prey, mainly arthropods, amidst the foliage.  It can be found as a member of a mixed-species feeding flock.  The bird also takes fruit, preferentially that of mistletoes (order Santalales).

References

mistletoe tyrannulet
Birds of Guatemala
Birds of Honduras
Birds of Nicaragua
Birds of Costa Rica
Birds of Panama
Birds of Colombia
mistletoe tyrannulet
mistletoe tyrannulet